The German Chess Championship has been played since 1861, and determines the national champion. Prior to 1880, three different federations organized chess activities in Germany: the Westdeutscher Schachbund (WDSB), the Norddeutscher Schachbund (NDSB) and the Mitteldeutscher Schachbund (MDSB). Each one organized its own championship. In 1880, the nationwide Deutscher Schachbund was founded, so afterwards only one German championship was played.

Starting from 1933, the Nazi Party took control of all social activities and until 1943 all chess championships were organized by the Großdeutscher Schachbund. After the end of World War II, separate championships were played in the occupied zones. Afterwards, from 1950 to 1989, two national championships were held in the Federal Republic of Germany and the German Democratic Republic. After the reunification of Germany in 1989, a single tournament has been played.

Championships, 1861–1932

WDSB-Congresses, 1861–1880
{| class="sortable wikitable"
! # !!Year !! City !! Winner
|-
|1
|1861
|Düsseldorf
|no masters participated
|-
|2
|1862
|Düsseldorf
|Max Lange
|-
|3
|1863
|Düsseldorf
|Max Lange
|-
|4
|1864
|Düsseldorf
|Max Lange
|-
|5
|1865
|Elberfeld
|Gustav Neumann
|-
|6
|1867
|Cologne
|Wilfried Paulsen
|-
|7
|1868
|Aachen
|Max Lange
|-
|8
|1869
|Barmen
|Adolf Anderssen
|-
|9
|1871
|Krefeld
|Louis Paulsen 
|-
|10
|1876
|Düsseldorf
|Wilfried Paulsen
|-
|11
| 1877
|Cologne
|Johannes Zukertort
|-
|12
| 1878
|Frankfurt
|Louis Paulsen
|-
|13
|1880
|Braunschweig
|Louis Paulsen
|}

MDSB-Congresses, 1871–1877

NDSB-Congresses, 1868–1872

German Congresses, 1879–1932 

{| class="sortable wikitable"
! # !!Year !! City !! Winner
|-
|1
|1879
| Leipzig
|Berthold Englisch
|-
|2
|1881
| Berlin
|Joseph Henry Blackburne  	
|-
|3
|1883
| Nuremberg
|Simon Winawer
|-
|4
|1885 
| Hamburg 	 		
|Isidor Gunsberg 
|-
|5
|1887
| Frankfurt
|George Henry Mackenzie
|-
|6
|1889 
| Breslau 
|Siegbert Tarrasch 
|-
|7
|1892
| Dresden
|Siegbert Tarrasch
|-
|8
|1893
| Kiel
|Carl Walbrodt  Curt von Bardeleben
|-
|9
|1894
| Leipzig
|Siegbert Tarrasch
|-
|10
|1896
| Eisenach
|Robert Henry Barnes 
|-
|11
|1898
| Cologne
|Amos Burn
|-
|12
|1900
| Munich
|Géza Maróczy  Harry Nelson Pillsbury  Carl Schlechter
|-
|13
|1902
| Hannover
|Dawid Janowski
|-
|14
|1904
| Coburg
|Curt von Bardeleben  Carl Schlechter  Rudolf Swiderski 
|-
|15
|1906 
| Nuremberg
|Frank James Marshall 
|-
|16
|1908
| Düsseldorf
|Frank James Marshall
|-
|17
|1910
| Hamburg
|Carl Schlechter
|-
|18
|1912
| Breslau
|Oldřich Duras  Akiba Rubinstein 	 
|-
|19
|1914
| Mannheim 
|Alexander Alekhine
|-
|20
|1920
| Berlin
|Friedrich Sämisch
|-
|21
|1921
| Hamburg
|Ehrhardt Post 
|-
|22
|1922
| Bad Oeynhausen 
|Ehrhardt Post
|-
|23
|1923
| Frankfurt
|Ernst Grünfeld
|-
|24
|1925
| Breslau
|Efim Bogoljubow
|-
|25
|1927
| Magdeburg
|Rudolf Spielmann
|-
|26
|1929
| Duisburg
|Carl Ahues
|-
|27
|1931
| Swinemünde
|Efim Bogoljubow   Ludwig Rödl 
|-
|28
|1932
| Bad Ems
|Georg Kieninger
|}

German Championships, 1933–1949

Championships in Nazi Germany, 1933–1943
{| class="sortable wikitable"
! # !!Year !! City !! Winner
|-
|1 
|1933
| Bad Pyrmont
| Efim Bogoljubow
|-
|2
|1934
| Bad Aachen
| Carl Carls
|-
|3
|1935
| Bad Aachen
| Kurt Richter
|-
|4
|1937
| Bad Oeynhausen
| Georg Kieninger
|-
|5
|1938
| Bad Oeynhausen
| Erich Eliskases
|-
|6
|1939
| Bad Oeynhausen 
| Erich Eliskases
|-
|7
|1940
| Bad Oeynhausen
| Georg Kieninger
|-
|8
|1941
| Bad Oeynhausen
| Paul Felix Schmidt    Klaus Junge
|-
|9
|1942
| Bad Oeynhausen
| Ludwig Rellstab
|-
|10
|1943
| Vienna
| Josef Lokvenc 
|}

Western and Soviet zones championships, 1946–1953

Western zone championships, 1947–1953

Soviet zone championships, 1946–1949

West and East Germany championships

West Germany championships, 1953–1989
{| class="sortable wikitable"
! # !!Year !! City !! Winner
|-
|1
|1953
|Berlin
| Wolfgang Unzicker
|-
|2
|1955
|Frankfurt am Main
| Klaus Darga 
|-
|3
|1957
|Bad Neuenahr
| Paul Tröger
|-
|4
|1959
|Nürnberg
| Wolfgang Unzicker
|-
|5
|1961
|Bad Pyrmont
| Klaus Darga 
|-
|6
|1963
|Bad Pyrmont
| Wolfgang Unzicker
|-
|7
|1965
|Bad Aibling
| Wolfgang Unzicker, Helmut Pfleger  
|-
|8
|1967
|Kiel
| Robert Hübner, Hans Besser 	
|-
|9
|1969
|Königsfeld
| Manfred Christoph 	
|-
|10
|1970
|Völklingen
| Hans-Joachim Hecht
|-
|11
|1971
|Berlin
| Svetozar Gligorić (international)
|-
|12
|1972
|Oberursel
| Hans Günther Kestler
|-
|13
|1973 
|Dortmund
| Hans-Joachim Hecht, Ulf Andersson    Boris Spassky (international) 
|-
|14
|1974
|Menden
| Peter Ostermeyer
|-
|15
|1975
|Mannheim
| Walter Browne (international)
|-
|16
|1976
|Bad Pyrmont
| Klaus Wockenfuss
|-
|17
|1977
|Bad Lauterberg
| Anatoly Karpov  (international)
|-
|18
|1978
|Bad Neuenahr
| Ludek Pachman
|-
|19
|1979
|Munich
| Boris Spassky, Yuri Balashov   Ulf Andersson (international)
|-
|20
|1980
|Bad Neuenahr
| Eric Lobron
|-
|21
|1981
|Bochum
| Lubomir Kavalek (international)
|-
|22
|1982
|Bad Neuenahr
| Manfred Glienke  	 
|-
|23
|1983
|Hannover
| Anatoly Karpov  (international)
|-
|24
|1984
|Bad Neuenahr
| Eric Lobron
|-
|25
|1987
|Bad Neuenahr
| Vlastimil Hort, Ralf Lau
|-
|26
|1988
|Bad Lauterberg
| Bernd Schneider
|-
|27
|1989
|Bad Neuenahr
| Vlastimil Hort, Eckhard Schmittdiel 
|}

East Germany championships, 1950–1990 
{| class="sortable wikitable"
! # !!Year !! City !! Winner
|-
|1
|1950
|Sömmerda
| Rudolf Elstner
|-
|2
|1951
|Schwerin
| Georg Stein
|-
|3
|1952
|Binz
| Berthold Koch
|-
|4
|1953
|Jena
| Reinhart Fuchs
|-
|5
|1954
|Meerane
| Wolfgang Uhlmann
|-
|6
|1955
|Zwickau
| Wolfgang Uhlmann  
|-
|7
|1956
|Leipzig
| Reinhart Fuchs
|-
|8
|1957
|Sömmerda
| Burkhard Malich 
|-
|9
|1958
|Schkopau
| Wolfgang Uhlmann
|-
|10
|1959
|Leipzig
| Wolfgang Pietzsch 
|-
|11
|1961
|Premnitz
| Lothar Zinn 
|-
|12
|1962
|Gera  
| Wolfgang Pietzsch 
|-
|13
|1963
|Aschersleben
| Günther Möhring
|-
|14
|1964
|Magdeburg
| Wolfgang Uhlmann
|-
|15
|1965
|Annaberg-Buchholz 
| Lothar Zinn
|-
|16
|1967
|Colditz
| Wolfgang Pietzsch
|-
|17
|1968
|Weimar
| Wolfgang Uhlmann
|-
|18
|1969
|Schwerin
| Lutz Espig
|-
|19
|1970
|Freiberg 
| Friedrich Baumbach	
|-
|20
|1971
|Strausberg
| Lutz Espig
|-
|21
|1972
|Görlitz
| Manfred Schöneberg
|-
|22
|1973
|Erfurt
| Burkhard Malich
|-
|23
|1974
|Potsdam
| Rainer Knaak
|-
|24
|1975
|Stralsund
| Wolfgang Uhlmann 
|-
|25
|1976
|Gröditz
| Wolfgang Uhlmann
|-
|26
|1977
|Frankfurt/Oder
| Lothar Vogt
|-
|27
|1978
|Eggesin
| Rainer Knaak
|-
|28
|1979
|Suhl
| Lothar Vogt  
|-
|29
|1980
|Plauen
| Hans-Ulrich Grünberg
|-
|30
|1981
|Fürstenwalde
| Wolfgang Uhlmann
|-
|31
|1982
|Salzwedel
| Rainer Knaak 
|-
|32
|1983
|Cottbus
| Rainer Knaak, Wolfgang Uhlmann 
|-
|33
|1984
|Eilenburg
| Rainer Knaak
|-
|34
|1985
|Jüterbog
| Wolfgang Uhlmann 
|-
|35
|1986
|Nordhausen
| Wolfgang Uhlmann
|-
|36
|1987
|Glauchau
| Raj Tischbierek
|-
|37
|1988
|Stralsund
| Lutz Espig, Thomas Pähtz
|-
|38
|1989
|Zittau
| Hans-Ulrich Grünberg
|-
|39
|1990
|Bad Blankenburg
| Raj Tischbierek, Thomas Pähtz
|}

German championships since 1991

{| class="sortable wikitable"
! # !!Year !! City !! Winner
|-
|1
|1991
| Bad Neuenahr
| Vlastimil Hort
|-
|2
|1993
| Bad Wildbad
| Thomas Luther, Thomas Pähtz  	
|-
|3
|1994
| Binz 
| Peter Enders 
|-
|4
|1995
| Binz
|Christopher Lutz
|-
|5
|1996
| Dudweiler
| Matthias Wahls 
|-
|6
|1996
| Nussloch
| Rustem Dautov, Artur Yusupov 
|-
|7
|1997
| Gladenbach
| Matthias Wahls
|-
|8
|1998
| Bremen
| Jörg Hickl
|-
|9
|1999
| Altenkirchen
| Robert Hübner
|-
|10
|2000
| Heringsdorf
| Robert Rabiega
|-
|11
|2001
| Altenkirchen
| Christopher Lutz
|-
|12
|2002
| Saarbrücken
| Thomas Luther
|-
|13
|2004
| Höckendorf
| Alexander Graf
|-
|14
|2005
| Altenkirchen
| Artur Yusupov
|-
|15
|2006
| Osterburg 
| Thomas Luther
|-
|16
|2007
| Bad Königshofen 
| Arkadij Naiditsch 	
|-
|17
|2008
| Bad Wörishofen
| Daniel Fridman 
|-
|18
|2009
| Saarbrücken
| Arik Braun
|- 
|19
|2010
| Bad Liebenzell
| Niclas Huschenbeth
|-
|20
|2011
| Bonn
| Igor Khenkin
|-
|21
|2012
| Osterburg
| Daniel Fridman
|-
|22
|2013
| Saarbrücken
| Klaus Bischoff
|-
|23
|2014
| Verden an der Aller
| Daniel Fridman
|-
|24
|2015
| Saarbrücken
| Klaus Bischoff
|-
|25
|2016
| Lübeck
| Sergey Kalinitschew
|-
|26
|2017
| Apolda
| Liviu-Dieter Nisipeanu
|-
|27
|2018
| Dresden
| Rainer Buhmann
|-
|28
|2019
| Magdeburg
| Niclas Huschenbeth
|-
|29
|2020
| Magdeburg
|Matthias Blübaum
|-
|30
|2021
| Magdeburg
|Jonas Rosner
|-
|31
|2022
| Magdeburg
|Leonardo Costa
|}

Women

Congress of the German Chess Federation, 1927

Championships of the Greater German Chess Federation, 1939–1943

All-German championships, 1947–1953

Championships of West Germany, 1953–1989

Open German Women's Championships since 1971

International Open German Women's Championships since 1977

Championships of the Soviet occupation zone, 1948–1949

Championships of the GDR, 1950–1990

German championships since 1991 

The German Women's Championship is held every odd-numbered year as a 9-round Swiss tournament (DFEM). In even-numbered years an international open tournament is held (IODFEM).

{| class="sortable wikitable"
!Year !! City !! Winner
|-
|1991
| Beverungen
| Anke Koglin
|-
|1993
| Bad Mergentheim
| Marina Olbrich
|-
|1995
| Krefeld
| Tatiana Grabuzova
|-
|1997
| Ottweiler
| Marina Olbrich
|-
|1999
| Chemnitz
| Elisabeth Pähtz
|-
|2001
| Krefeld
| Jessica Nill
|-
|2003
| Altenkirchen
| Annemarie Sylvia Meier
|-
|2005
| Bad Königshofen
| Sandra Krege
|-
|2007
| Osterburg
| Ljubov Kopylov
|-
|2009
| Hockenheim
| Polina Zilberman
|-
|2011
| Bonn
| Sarah Hoolt
|-
|2013
| Bad Wiessee
| Hanna Marie Klek
|-
|2015
| Bad Wiessee
| Zoya Schleining
|-
|2017
| Bad Wiessee
| Jana Schneider
|-
|2019
| Magdeburg
| Marta Michna
|-
|2020
| Magdeburg
|Carmen Voicu-Jagodzinsky
|-
|2021
| Magdeburg
|Elena Köpke
|-
|2022
| Magdeburg
|Lara Schulze
|}

References

https://web.archive.org/web/20080608070445/http://schachbund.de/chronik/meister/dem/index.html
http://xoomer.alice.it/cserica/scacchi/storiascacchi/tornei/pagine/germania.htm

External links

Chess national championships
Women's chess national championships
Chess in Germany